The year 1932 in television involved some significant events.
Below is a list of television-related events during 1932.


Events
 March 9 – The U.S. Federal Radio Commission grants  an operating license to Kansas State University in Manhattan, Kansas, for the television station W9XAK.
 August 22 – The BBC starts a regular television service, using John Logie Baird's 30-line system. EMI demonstrate  electronic television, with as many as 3 times as many lines as Baird's mechanical system, to the BBC.
 December – René Barthélemy starts operating an experimental weekly programme of one hour with a 60-line black-and-white system "Paris Télévision".

Television shows

Births
January 3 – Dabney Coleman, actor, Buffalo Bill.
January 12 – Des O'Connor, television personality and singer (died 2020).
January 13 – Jon Cypher, actor, Hill Street Blues.
January 17 – Sheree North, actress (died 2005).
February 1 – John Hart, retired American television journalist
February 2 – Robert Mandan, actor, Soap (died 2018).
February 16 – Gretchen Wyler, actress (died 2007).
February 23 – Majel Barrett, actress, Star Trek (died 2008).
February 24 – Jay Sandrich, director (died 2021).
February 26 – Johnny Cash, singer and actor, The Johnny Cash Show (died 2003).
February 27 – Elizabeth Taylor, actress (died 2011).
February 29 – Edward Faulkner, actor.
March 2 – Paul Sand, actor.
March 19 – Gail Kobe, actress (died 2013).
April 1 – Debbie Reynolds, actress (died 2016).
April 4 – John Clarke, actor, Days of Our Lives.
April 25 – William Roache, actor, Coronation Street.
April 27 – Casey Kasem, broadcast announcer, Scooby-Doo (died 2014).
April 30 – E. Duke Vincent, American television producer.
May 13 – Gianni Boncompagni, radio and TV presenter and director (died 2017).
June 17 – Peter Lupus, actor, Mission: Impossible.
June 22 – Prunella Scales, English actress, Fawlty Towers.
June 28 – Pat Morita, actor, Happy Days (died 2005).
July 8 – Brian Walden, journalist, broadcaster and Member of Parliament (died 2019).
July 31 – Ted Cassidy, actor, The Addams Family (died 1979).
August 5 – Ja'Net DuBois, American actress, singer and dancer, Good Times (died 2020).
August 9 – Reginald Bosanquet, journalist and news presenter (died 1984).
August 15 – Jim Lange, game show host (died 2014).
September 3 – Eileen Brennan, actress, Private Benjamin (died 2013).
September 5 – Carol Lawrence, actress.
September 14 – Igor Kirillov, news presenter, Tsentral'noye televideniye SSSR (died 2021).
September 25 – Charles Stanley, pastor
September 26 
Donna Douglas, actress, The Beverly Hillbillies (died 2015).
Richard Herd, actor (died 2020).
September 27 – Roger C. Carmel, actor, The Mothers-in-Law (died 1986).
October 12 – Dick Gregory, actor (died 2017).
October 20 – William Christopher, actor, M*A*S*H (died 2016).
November 4 – Noam Pitlik, director (died 1999).
November 13 – Richard Mulligan, actor, Soap (died 2000).
November 20 – Richard Dawson, game show host (died 2012).
November 22 – Robert Vaughn, actor, The Man from U.N.C.L.E. (died 2016).
December 18 – Roger Smith, actor, 77 Sunset Strip (died 2017).
December 20 – John Hillerman, actor, Magnum, P.I. (died 2017).
December 25 – Mabel King, actress (died 1999).
December 28 – Nichelle Nichols, singer and actress, Star Trek (died 2022).
December 29 – Inga Swenson, actress, Benson.

References